Savin Chem (born 11 November 1943) is a Cambodian sprinter. He competed in the men's 400 metres at the 1972 Summer Olympics.

References

External links
 

1943 births
Living people
Athletes (track and field) at the 1972 Summer Olympics
Cambodian male sprinters
Olympic athletes of Cambodia
Place of birth missing (living people)
Southeast Asian Games medalists in athletics
Southeast Asian Games silver medalists for Cambodia
Competitors at the 1973 Southeast Asian Peninsular Games